Brunello is an Italian surname. Notable people with the surname include:

Duilio Brunello (born 1925), Argentine Peronist politician
Giorgio Brunello, Italian economist
Marina Brunello (born 1994), Italian women chess grandmaster
Mario Brunello (born 1960), Italian cellist and musician
Sabino Brunello (born 1989), Italian chess grandmaster
Sereno Brunello (born 1938), Italian rower

See also 

 Brunelli
 Brunello (disambiguation)

Italian-language surnames